The European South African Science and Technology Advancement Programme (ESASTAP) promotes research and development cooperation between South Africa and the European Union. Its offices are located at the CSIR Campus in Pretoria, South Africa and Brussels, Belgium.

History 
The programme has evolved in an iterative manner, adapting to changing relationships and advancements in technology within the SA-EU context.

Funding 
The major sources of funding for ESASTAP are the European Commission, through the Seventh Framework Programme, and the South African Department of Science and Innovation.

In the 2020/2021 financial year, the department received official development assistance (ODA) from the European Union of R5 000 000 over a three-year period, earmarked for ESASTAP projects and activities.

External links 
 Official Website

Other Bilat (and) related projects 
 List of all current BILAT projects
 ABEST/A-EU: Argentinean Bureau for Enhancing Cooperation with the European Community in the Science, Technology and Innovation Area
 BB.Bice: Brazilian Bureau for Enhancing the International Cooperation with European Union
 ERA-Can: The European Research Area and Canada
 CHIEP: Strengthen Chilean European Science and Technology Partnerships
 BILAT SILK: Bilateral Support for the International Linkage with China
 EUINEC: European Union and India Enhanced Cooperation Framework for Improved Bilateral Dialogue in the Fields of Science and Technology
 J-BILAT: BILAT in Japan
 ERA-Link/Japan: A network for European researchers in Japan
 KESTCAP: Korea-EU Science and Technology Cooperation Advancement Programme
 UEMEXCyT: Bureau for European and Mexican Science and Technology Cooperation
 M2ERA: Morocco To ERA
 FRENZ: Facilitating Research co-operation between Europe and New Zealand
 BILAT-RUS: Enhancing the bilateral S&T Partnership with the Russian Federation
 ETC: European Tunisian Cooperatio
 BILAT-USA: Bilateral coordination for the enhancement and development of S&T partnerships between the European Union and the United States of America

References 

2005 establishments in South Africa
South Africa–European Union relations